Juan David "Juanda" Fuentes Garrido (born 19 May 2003) is a Colombian professional footballer currently playing as a forward for Barcelona B.

Club career
Born in Montería, Colombia, to a Spanish father and Colombian mother, Fuentes moved to Spain at the age of four. He started his footballing career with Montcada, before spending a year-long spell at TecnoFutbol CF, followed by a return to Montcada, where he proved himself a prolific goalscorer - scoring 103 goals in one season.

He joined Barcelona, and signed his first professional contract in July 2019. After impressing at youth level, he was called up to training with the Barcelona first team squad for the first time in November 2021. After continuing his good performances, and breaking into the Barcelona B team, he signed a contract renewal in September 2022.

International career
Fuentes has represented Colombia at youth international level.

Career statistics

Club

Notes

References

2003 births
Living people
People from Montería
People from Córdoba Department
Colombian footballers
Colombia youth international footballers
Spanish footballers
Colombian people of Spanish descent
Association football forwards
Primera Federación players
FC Barcelona Atlètic players